The Night of the White Pants is a 2006 comedy drama written and directed by Amy Talkington.

Plot summary
Max Hagan, a Texas oil tycoon, is going through a difficult divorce. When his soon-to-be ex-wife throws him out of his house with nothing but the clothes he's wearing (including the titular "white pants"), he becomes entangled in a sex, drugs and rock-'n'-roll-laden adventure with his daughter's punk-rocker boyfriend as he tries to make things right between himself and his dysfunctional family.

Main cast
Tom Wilkinson – Max Hagan
Selma Blair – Beth Hagan
Nick Stahl – Raff
Frances Fisher – Vivian Hagan
Janine Turner – Barbara
Fran Kranz - Millian Hagan

References

External links

2006 films
American comedy-drama films
2006 comedy-drama films
Films about dysfunctional families
Films shot in Texas
2006 comedy films
2006 drama films
2000s English-language films
2000s American films